The following is a list of women classical cellists by nationality – notable women who are well known for their work in the field of classical music.

Argentina
Sol Gabetta (born 1981), classical cellist, orchestral performer, recording artist and educator, now resident in Switzerland

Australia
Christine Jackson (1962–2016), British-born Australian cellist, member of the Australian Chamber Orchestra, played didgeridoo duos

Belgium 

 Flavie Van den Hende (1865-1925), Belgian-born and -trained cellist, worked and died in the US

Canada
Soo Bae (born 1977), Korean-born Canadian cellist now in New York
Denise Djokic (born 1980), cellist, soloist and recitalist
Suzette Forgues Halasz (1918–2004), cellist and musical educator, orchestral principal cellist
Amanda Forsyth (born 1966), recitalist, soloist and chamber musician
Ofra Harnoy (born 1965), prominent Israeli-born Canadian cellist, award-winning soloist and recording artist
Dorothy Lawson (fl. 1990s), cellist, chamber musician and composer based in New York City
Dáirine Ní Mheadhra (fl. 1990s), Irish-born Canadian cellist, conductor and opera producer
Zara Nelsova (1918 - 2002), cellist from Winnipeg
Shauna Rolston (born 1967), child prodigy, recitalist and soloist, educator

China
Jiaxin Cheng (born 1974), soloist, recitalist and recording artist now based in London, married Julian Lloyd Webber
Tina Guo (born 1985), Chinese-American cellist, practising classical and modern genres, soloist and recording artist
Ma Siju (1920–2014), pianist and cellist, recognized educator, retired in 1986

Czech Republic
Michaela Fukačová (born 1959), award-winning classical cellist

Ecuador 

 Teodelinda Terán Hicks (1889-1959), Ecuadorian cellist, trained in London, based in California

France
Valérie Aimard (born 1969), concert cellist, chamber musician and recording artist
Martine Bailly (born 1946), classical cellist, first cello of the Orchestre de l'Opéra national de Paris
Emmanuelle Bertrand (born 1973), award-winning soloist and recording artist
Lisa Cristiani (born 1827), classical cellist, one of the first professional female cellists in Europe
Reine Flachot (1922–1998), international cellist and educator
Ophélie Gaillard (born 1974), cellist, chamber musician and educator
Anne Gastinel (born 1971), international cellist, performances from the age of 12, educator
Astrig Siranossian (born 1988), child prodigy, concert performed, chamber musician and recording artist
Mathilde Sternat (fl. 1995), chamber musician and arranger
Agnès Vesterman (fl. 1980s), duet performer, recording artist and educator
Sonia Wieder-Atherton (born 1961), Franco-American orchestral soloist, chamber musician and recording artist

Germany
Kristin von der Goltz (born 1966), German-Norwegian cellist, specializing in baroque, chamber musician
Marie-Elisabeth Hecker (born 1987), award-winning young cellist
Eva Heinitz (1907–2001), cellist, violist and educator who settled in the United States
Bettina Hoffmann (born 1959), viola da gambist, cellist, musicologist and educator
Maria Kliegel (born 1952), cellist, recording artist and educator
Anita Lasker-Wallfisch (born 1925), cellist, surviving member of the Women's Orchestra in Auschwitz
Margarethe Quidde (1858-1940), Prussian-born cellist, writer, pacifist in Munich
Eleonore Schoenfeld (born 1925), influential 20th-century cellist, recording artist and educator

Hungary
Rozsi Varady (1902–1933), concert cellist popular in the United States and Europe

Ireland
Ailbhe McDonagh (born 1982), soloist, chamber musician and composer

Lithuania
Giedrė Dirvanauskaitė (born 1976), founding member of the Kremerata Baltica chamber orchestra, orchestral concert performer

Luxembourg
Françoise Groben (1965–2011), cellist playing with many notable orchestras, chamber musician and recording artist

Netherlands
Josephine van Lier (born 1968), performing cellist specialized in baroque, contemporary and chamber music, residing in Canada
Mayke Rademakers (fl. 2000s), recitalist, soloist and chamber musician, recording artist

Norway
Birgitta Elisa Oftestad (born 2002), soloist, chamber musician

Portugal
Guilhermina Suggia (1885–1950), worked with Pablo Casals in Paris, toured internationally, also chamber musician

Russia
Tanya Anisimova (born 1966), cellist and composer
Natalia Gutman (born 1942), soloist, chamber musician, interested in contemporary music
Nina Kotova (born 1969), recitalist and soloist with major orchestras, educator and recording artist
Anna Luboshutz (1887–1975), major career in Russia as a soloist and chamber musician
Natalia Shakhovskaya (1935–2017), award-winning international cellist and educator
Tatjana Vassiljeva (born 1977), award-winning Russian cellist, appeared with many notable orchestras and toured widely

Serbia
Maja Bogdanović (born 1982), classical cellist now based in Paris
Jelena Mihailović (born 1987), classical and contemporary cellist based in Belgrade and Los Angeles

South Korea
Myung-wha Chung (born 1944), concert cellist, chamber musician and educator, now based in New York City
Han-na Chang (born 1982), conductor and cellist
Su-a Lee (fl. 1998), cellist, member of the Scottish Chamber Orchestra, recording artist
Hee-Young Lim (born 1987), award-winning classical cellist, principal solo cellist with the Rotterdam Philharmonic Orchestra
Meehae Ryo (born 1967), international soloist and educator

Spain
Teresa Bernabe (born 1983), classical and contemporary cellist, singer-songwriter

Sweden
Walborg Lagerwall (1851–1940), toured Scandinavia, cellist at the Royal Swedish Opera

United Kingdom
Natalie Clein (born 1977), classical cellist, chamber musician and recording artist
Caroline Dale (born 1965), cellist and recording artist
Jacqueline du Pré (1945–1987), prominent cellist performing internationally with numerous orchestras, career cut short by multiple sclerosis 
Amaryllis Fleming (1925–1999), classical cellist, chamber musician, Baroque cello performer and educator
Olga Hegedus (1920–2017), cellist, co-principal of the English Chamber Orchestra
Louise Hopkins (born 1968), international soloist, broadcaster and educator
Peggie Sampson (1912–2004), cellist, viola da gambist and educator
Anna Shuttleworth (born 1927), cellist and educator
Amanda Truelove (born 1961), cellist and educator

United States
Eleanor Aller (1917–1995), cellist, chamber musician and principal cellist in the Warner Bros Studio Orchestra
Cecylia Barczyk (fl. 1980s), Polish-born American cellist and educator
Maya Beiser (born 1963), Israeli-born American cellist and producer
Evangeline Benedetti (born 1941), first female cellist of the New York Philharmonic
Phoebe Carrai (born 1955), cellist, chamber musician and educator
Alison Chesley (born 1960), cellist, composer and recording artist
Kristina Reiko Cooper (fl. 1990s), cellist, solo artist, chamber musician and recording artist
Nadine Deleury (fl. 1980s), French-born American cellist, chamber opera performer and educator
Kate Dillingham (fl. 1993), cellist, soloist and chamber musician
Eileen Folson (1956–2007), composer and cellist
Raya Garbousova (1909–1997), cellist and educator
Sarah Gurowitsch (1889-1981), Russian-born American cellist
Elsa Hilger (1904–2005), Austrian-born American cellist who gave recitals until she was 95
Mimi Hwang (fl. 1980s), cellist and chamber musician
Joan Jeanrenaud (born 1956), cellist and recording artist
Maureen May (born 1962), cellist and conductor
Zara Nelsova (1918–2002), Canadian-born American orchestral cellist and chamber musician who performed from an early age
Maxine Neuman (born 1948), chamber musician, orchestral cellist and educator
Sharon Robinson (born 1949), cellist, concert solo artist, chamber musician and recording artist
Marcy Rosen (fl. 1980s), concerto cellist, chamber musician and educator
Sara Sant'Ambrogio (born 1962), chamber musician, member of the Eroica Trio, interested in contemporary composers
Eleonore Schoenfeld (1924–2007), one of the 20th century's most influential cellists
Eleonore Schoenfeld (born 1993), cellist and concert performer
Frances-Marie Uitti (born 1948), cellist known for performing contemporary classical music
Christine Walevska (born 1945), international classical cellist, recording artist and educator
Wendy Warner (born c. 1972), international orchestral cellist, chamber musician and educator
Alisa Weilerstein (born 1982), classical cellist, soloist and chamber musician
Olga Zilboorg (1933–2017), Mexican-born American cellist and educator

See also
Lists of women in music
Women in classical music

References

Lists of musicians by instrument
Classical cellists
+
Lists of women in music